Torri Webster (born August 12, 1996) is a Canadian actress. She is known for her starring role as Tess Foster in the YTV teen sitcom Life with Boys, which earned her the Young Artist Award for Best Leading Young Actress in a TV Series. Webster also played the recurring character of PeaseBlossom, an eccentric fairy in the Nickelodeon show The Other Kingdom.

Early life and education 
Webster was born in Toronto, Ontario, Canada to parents Steve and Tracy Webster from the Don Mills area. As a child, Webster was always performing. She started out dancing at the age of three and loved performing on stage with her dance teams.  She attended a French immersion elementary school but was drawn to the performing arts as a teen.  As a teen, she attended high school at the Wexford Collegiate School for the Arts in Scarborough, Ontario, where she further enhanced her performing skills on stage playing leads in various musical theatre productions. She then studied musical theatre at the New York University Tisch School of the Arts in 2014, and marketing and film studies at Ryerson University, where she graduated with a Bachelor of Arts (Creative Industries) with distinction in 2018.

Filmography

Accolades

References

External links 
 
  

1996 births
Living people
21st-century Canadian actresses
Actresses from Toronto
Canadian child actresses
Canadian film actresses
Canadian television actresses